Rogue Island or Rogue's Island may refer to:

 Rogue Island, Bermuda, an island of Bermuda
 Little Rogue's Island, an island of Bermuda
 Rhode Island, a U.S. state (facetiously nicknamed "Rogue's Island" in the 17th century)